IJB may refer to:

International Journal of Biomathematics
International Journal of Biometeorology
International Journal of Biosciences